William Christie  (26 January 1817 – 12 December 1885) was a Scottish clergyman, inaugural Dean of the United Diocese of Moray, Ross, and Caithness, having been the Dean of Ross since 1860.

Christie was born in Monquhitter, the son of William Christie, dancing-master of Monquhitter, and his wife Mary. He studied at King's College, Aberdeen. In addition to his ecclesiastical achievements, he was a folk song collector who published two volumes of songs entitled Traditional Ballad Airs, in 1876 and 1881.

He died in Fochabers.

References

1816 births
1885 deaths
People from Formartine
Alumni of the University of Aberdeen
Scottish Episcopalian clergy
Deans of Moray, Ross and Caithness
Scottish folk-song collectors
19th-century musicologists